Mario Alonso Pérez López (born 13 July 1975 in Santa Bárbara) is a Honduran lawyer and politician. He currently serves as the secretary of the National Congress of Honduras representing the National Party of Honduras for Santa Bárbara. He is married and has one daughter.

References

1975 births
Living people
People from Santa Bárbara Department, Honduras
21st-century Honduran lawyers
Deputies of the National Congress of Honduras
National Party of Honduras politicians